Thomas van Bommel (born 11 July 2002) is a Dutch professional footballer who plays as a midfielder for Eerste Divisie club MVV.

Club career
Van Bommel made his professional debut for MVV in the Eerste Divisie on 22 September 2020, coming on as an 88th-minute substitute for Jelle Duin in a 2–0 loss to Den Bosch. On 30 October, he replaced Kai Heerings with four minutes to play against Helmond Sport and scored his first professional goal to equalise in a 1–1 away draw.

Personal life
Van Bommel's father is Mark van Bommel, while his maternal grandfather is Bert van Marwijk. The former played for the Netherlands in the 2010 FIFA World Cup Final, in which the latter was the manager.

Career statistics

References

2002 births
Living people
People from Meerssen
Footballers from Limburg (Netherlands)
Dutch footballers
Association football midfielders
Fortuna Sittard players
SV Meerssen players
MVV Maastricht players
Eerste Divisie players